Camila Martins de Aguiar (born 26 September 1990), known as Camila Martins or simply Camila, is a Brazilian footballer who plays as a central defender for Santos FC.

Club career
In 2015, she joined Santos, being initially a backup option Calan.

After Calan retired, Camila Martins became an undisputed starter for Peixe before moving abroad for the 2019 season with Chinese side . She returned to her home country in 2019 after the season ended, but delayed her return to China for a few months due to the due COVID-19 pandemic outbreak in the country.

On 8 February 2021, Camila Martins was presented back at Santos for the 2021 campaign.

International career
On 9 November 2017, Camila Martins was called up by Brazil national team manager Vadão for two friendlies against Chile.

Honours
Santos
Campeonato Brasileiro de Futebol Feminino Série A1: 2017
Campeonato Paulista de Futebol Feminino: 2018

References

1990 births
Living people
Sportspeople from Recife
Brazilian women's footballers
Women's association football defenders
Campeonato Brasileiro de Futebol Feminino Série A1 players
Santos FC (women) players
Chinese Women's Super League players
Expatriate women's footballers in China
Brazilian expatriate women's footballers
Brazilian expatriate sportspeople in China